Adnan Gabeljic (born 13 April 1992) is an American former soccer player who played as a forward.

Career

Club career

Before the 2014 season, Gabeljic was drafted by American top flight side Sporting KC. After that, he signed for OKC Energy FC in the American third tier, where he made 2 league appearances and scored 0 goals. On 5 May 2014, Gabeljic debuted for OKC Energy FC during a 1–3 loss to Orlando City.

In 2014, Gabeljic signed for Croatian club Rudeš. Before the 2015 season, he signed for Sacramento Republic FC in the American third tier. Before the 2016 season, he signed for American fourth tier team San Francisco City FC.

International career

Gabeljic was eligible to represent Croatia internationally, having been born there and Bosnia and Herzegovina internationally through his parents.

References

External links
 Adnan Gabeljic at playmakerstats.com

1992 births
American people of Bosnia and Herzegovina descent
American soccer players
First Football League (Croatia) players
Association football forwards
Living people
OKC Energy FC players
NK Rudeš players
Sacramento Republic FC players
Saint Louis Billikens men's soccer players
Saint Louis University alumni
San Francisco City FC players
Footballers from Zagreb
USL League One players
USL League Two players